Norwegian Association of Literary Translators is an association for Norwegian literary translators, founded in 1948. The association has awarded the annual Bastian Prize from 1951, for best literary translation into the Norwegian language. The prize is a statue made by the sculptor Ørnulf Bast.

References

External links
Official Website
Importance Of Financial Translation

Organizations established in 1948
Translation associations of Norway
Norwaco